Agfa-Gevaert N.V. (Agfa) is a Belgian-German multinational corporation that develops, manufactures, and distributes analogue and digital imaging products, software, and systems. It has three divisions:
 Agfa Graphics, which offers integrated prepress and industrial inkjet systems to the printing and graphics industries.
 Agfa HealthCare, which supplies hospitals and other care organisations with imaging products and systems, and information systems.
 Agfa Specialty Products, which supplies products to various industrial markets. It is part of the Agfa Materials organization. In addition to the Agfa Specialty Products activities, Agfa Materials supplies film and related products to Agfa Graphics and Agfa HealthCare.
Agfa film and film cameras were once prominent consumer products. However, in 2004, the consumer imaging division was sold to a company founded via management buyout. AgfaPhoto GmbH, as the new company was called, filed for bankruptcy after just one year, and its brands are now licensed to other companies by AgfaPhoto Holding GmbH, a holding firm. Today Agfa-Gevaert's commerce is 100% business-to-business.

History 

 1867 The company Aktiengesellschaft für Anilinfabrikation (Corporation for Aniline Production) was founded in Rummelsburg (now in the Lichtenberg borough of Berlin) as a manufacturer of dyes and stains. It became a public limited company in 1873. The founders were Paul Mendelssohn Bartholdy (son of composer Felix Mendelssohn Bartholdy) and Carl Alexander von Martius.
 1894 The company L. Gevaert & Cie was founded in Antwerp, Belgium, arising from the workshop for the manufacture of photographic paper belonging to Lieven Gevaert.
 1897 Appearance of the Agfa trade mark.
 1898 Introduction of X-ray plates and film products.
 1903 Production of first cinematographic film.
 1925 As part of the consolidation of the German chemical industry, Agfa became part of IG Farben. The photographic activities are combined with those of Bayer, including a camera factory in Munich.
 1928 Acquired Ansco, an American photographic manufacturer, whose products were sold under the Agfa-Ansco brand name.
 1936 Agfacolor Neu a pioneering color film for amateurs and professionals.
 1940 Agfacolor negative-positive color material is used for the first time for a feature film Frauen sind doch bessere Diplomaten (Women make the best Diplomats) by the German UFA film studios.
 1941 American assets were seized during World War II as enemy property and became General Aniline and Film Corp., whose photographic products reverted to the Ansco brand name.
 1942 Introduction of intensifying screen products.
 1939-1945 Agfa used forced laborers in large numbers, including concentration camp prisoners in the Munich subcamp (Agfa Kamerawerke) of the Dachau concentration camp and in the Dutch transit camp Kamp Westerbork. Forced laborers were also used for Agfa AG in the "Agfa camp" subcamp of the Munich-Stadelheim juvenile prison between 1943 and 1945. Parts of the Agfa company management were indicted after the war in the I.G. Farben trial before an American military tribunal.
 1945 When the Allies broke up IG Farben to reduce the size of German chemical industry, Agfa reappeared as an individual business. An Agfa plant located in what was to become East Germany became the foundation of ORWO.
 1952 Re-establishment of Agfa AG as a wholly owned subsidiary of Bayer in Leverkusen.
 1964 Merger of Agfa AG and Gevaert Photo-Producten N.V. with Bayer AG and Gevaert each holding a 50% interest in the new operating company.
 1970 Introduction of Agfacontour Professional Sheet Film.
 1972 Introduction of mammography film / screen products.
 1981 Bayer buys out Gevaert and becomes 100% owner.
 1988 Acquisition of Compugraphic Corporation (prepress systems).
 1990
 Sale of magnetic tape business.
 Introduction of Computed Radiography (CR) products.
 1994 Introduction of PACS products.
 1996 Acquisition of Hoechst's printing plate and proofing business.
 1997 Sale of the company's film recorder division to German CCG Digital Image Technology.
 1998
 Acquisition of DuPont's offset printing and graphic arts film business.
 Sale of the company's Copier Systems business to Lanier Worldwide Inc.
 Acquisition of CEA AB (X-ray film products).
 Acquisition of Monotype Typography Inc.
 1999
 Acquisition of Sterling Diagnostic Imaging (X-ray film and equipment).
 Separation of Agfa from Bayer.  Initial public offering of Agfa-Gevaert shares on June 1.  Agfa listed on Brussels and Frankfurt stock exchanges.
 2000
 Acquisition of Krautkramer, a producer of ultrasonic systems for non-destructive testing.
 Acquisition of Quadrat, a Ghent-based European producer of radiology information systems.
 2001
 Acquisition of Autologic, an American producer of systems for prepress automation.
 Acquisition of Talk Technology, a producer of medical voice recognition systems.
 Acquisition of the German company Seifert and the American company Pantak, producers of industrial X-ray equipment for non-destructive testing applications.
 Acquisition of a minority interest in MediVision, a developer and manufacturer of digital imaging systems for ophthalmology.
 Agfa stopped its desktop scanners and digital camera business in September 2001. Agfa does not provide any further support.
 2002 
 Acquisition of Mitra Imaging Inc., a developer of medical imaging and information systems for healthcare.
 Bayer sells its remaining 30% stake in Agfa.
 2003
 Opening of new printing plate factory in Wuxi, China.
 Sale of non-destructive testing business to General Electric.
 2004
 Acquisition of Dotrix, a Belgian producer of digital colour printing systems for industrial applications.
 Acquisition of Lastra, an Italian manufacturer of plates, chemicals and equipment for the offset printing industry.
 Sale of the consumer imaging division to a company founded via management buy out, named AgfaPhoto, and held by an investment company.  After one year, AgfaPhoto files for bankruptcy.
 Acquisition of ProImage, an Israeli developer of browser-based digital workflow solutions for the newspaper and printing industries.
 Acquisition of Symphonie On Line, a French information technology company and developer of EPR (electronic patient record) systems.
 Sale of Agfa Monotype Corporation, a provider of fonts and font-related software technology, to Boston-based private equity investor TA Associates.
 2005
 Acquisition of GWI, a German developer of healthcare information systems for medical records, nursing, business management, and facility administration.
 Acquisition of Heartlab, Inc., a U.S. developer of cardiology image and information management systems.
 Acquisition of Med2Rad an Italian developer of radiology information systems.
 Introduction of industrial inkjet products.
 2009
 Acquisition of Insight Agents, a European developer and producer of contrast media.
 Acquisition of Gandi Innovations, a producer of large-format inkjet systems.
 2010
 Agfa Graphics and Shenzhen Brothers create the Agfa Graphics Asia joint venture to reinforce their position in the Greater China and ASEAN region.
 Acquisition of the Harold M. Pitman Company a US supplier of products and systems for the graphic industry.
 2011 Acquisition of WPD, a Brazilian supplier of healthcare IT systems.

Company structure
Headquartered in Mortsel, Belgium, Agfa has sales organisations in 40 countries. In countries where Agfa does not have its own sales organisation, the market is served by a network of agents and representatives. At the end of 2011, the company had 11,728 employees (full-time equivalent permanent) worldwide. Agfa has manufacturing plants around the world. The largest production and research centres are based in Belgium, the United States, Canada, Germany, France, Italy and China. Net sales for 2011 totalled 3,023 million euros.

Since January 1, 2019, two new entities emerged within the Agfa-Gevaert Group: Agfa HealthCare (ITCo) and Agfa (MainCo). Agfa HealthCare groups all IT-related activities of the former Agfa HealthCare business group. The newer Agfa includes the activities of the former Agfa Graphics and Agfa Specialty Products business groups, as well as the Imaging activities of the former Agfa HealthCare business group.

Agfa Healthcare 
Agfa Healthcare is a developer of medical imaging information systems, with main offices in Mortsel (Belgium), Ghent (Belgium), Waterloo (Ontario Canada), Shanghai (China) and Vienna (Austria).

Agfa division business groups 
The activities of the Agfa division have been subdivided into three groups: Offset Solutions (the prepress business of the former Agfa Graphics business group), Digital Print & Chemicals (the inkjet business of the former Agfa Graphics business group and the activities of the former Agfa Specialty Products business group) and Radiology Solutions (the imaging activities of the former Agfa HealthCare business group).

Products

In 2004, Agfa-Gevaert withdrew from the consumer market, including photographic film, cameras and other photographic equipment.

Because Agfa-Gevaert still produce photographic films for the aerial photography market, it is still possible to buy fresh, Agfa-produced photographic films for use in consumer cameras. They are sold by the Lomography Society and Rollei and are branded accordingly. This is because those companies purchase the aerial photography film from Agfa-Gevaert, and then cut and package it into consumer photographic formats.

As of 2012, such products carry a small Agfa logo discreetly on their packaging, but are not sold as Agfa branded products.

By contrast, Agfaphoto branded photographic films are not made by Agfa-Gevaert at all, originally having been made by the now closed Ferrania plant in Italy. Agfaphoto films are now produced by Fujifilm in Japan for Lupus Imaging Media.

Agfa cameras

Agfa produced a range of cameras which included:
 Ambiflex
 Silette series
 Clipper
 Billy
 Record
 Isolette
 Isola series
 Click
 Clack
 Optima series, e.g. Optima 1A
 Optima Sensor series, e.g. Optima 1535 Sensor and Optima Flash Sensor
 Selectronic S series
 Agfamatic series
 Agfamatic Pocket series
 Agfa Mini
 matching accessories, such as flashguns

SLR 
 Agfa Flexilette
 Selectronic series (rebranded products of Chinon)

Agfa slide projectors 
Including, roughly in chronological order:
 Agfa Opticus 100
 Agfa Agfacolor 50 automatic
 Agfa Diamator series, like models H, m, 1500

Agfa consumer and professional films
Black & White films:
 Agfa PD16
 Agfapan 25, 100 and 400
 Agfapan APX 25, 100 and 400 (revivals of 100 and 400 emulsion were announced by Adox)
 Isopan ISS (Super Special)
 Isopan F (Fine Grain)
 Isopan Ultra
 Isopan Record
 Agfa Vario-XL (C-41 process chromogenic film)
 Dia-Direct (reversal film)
 Scala (reversal film)
 Agfacontour Professional film

Colour reversal (slide) films:
 Agfacolor Neu
 Agfachrome CT 18 and CT 21
 Agfachrome series
 Agfachrome R 100 S
 Agfachrome 50 S and 50 L Professional
 Agfachrome RS and RS Plus Professional series
 Agfachrome RSX and RSX II Professional series
 Agfachrome CT, CTx and CT Precisa series (excluding New Agfaphoto CT Precisa 100)

Colour negative films:
 Agfacolor CN14, CN17, CN17M, CN17 Special, CNS and CNS2
 Agfacolor series
 Agfacolor XR series
 Agfacolor XRG series
 Agfacolor XRS Professional series
 Agfacolor Optima, Optima II and New Optima Professional series
 Agfacolor Portrait 160 Professional
 Agfacolor Ultra 50 Professional and Ultra 100 
 Agfacolor Vista series (excluding New Agfaphoto Vista 200)

While Agfa has retired from the photography branch, and the Agfaphoto brand was sold to a reseller named Lupus Imaging, the surviving Belgian industrial branch of Agfa continues to produce, among other things, B/W, colour negative and colour reversal materials for aerial photography. Some of these are cut to the usual 135 and 120 formats by Maco and distributed under the brand name Rollei. Specifically, these re-branded Agfa materials include Rollei Retro 80S, 200S and 400S, Digibase CN200 and CR200.

Scanners
Agfa produced many image scanners in the Arcus, DuoScan, SnapScan, StudioScan and StudioStar ranges. While they have all been discontinued and up-to-date drivers for them are not available from Agfa, Vuescan software supports many Agfa scanners on current computer operating systems.

Agfa darkroom equipment

 Agfa Varioscop enlargers
 Agfa Variomat print easels for automatic exposure
 Darkroom safety lights
 Agfa Rondinax and Rondix daylight developing tanks

Agfa papers
Agfa photographic papers were of very high quality; lines included:
 Brovira
 Portriga Rapid
 Lupex

The production of material identical to the last generation of fibre-based and resin-coated photographic Agfa Multigrade papers has been resumed by Adox.

See also

AgfaPhoto
Agfacolor
 Gevacolor
André Leysen
List of photographic equipment makers
Christian Reinaudo
List of photographic films
List of discontinued photographic films
Mixlink

References

External links 
 
AgfaHealthcare - International website Healthcare IT
 AgfaPhoto GmbH - Consumer imaging division which was sold off.

Agfa
Photographic film makers
IG Farben
Belgian brands
German brands
Technology companies established in 1964
Multinational companies headquartered in Belgium
Photography companies of Belgium
Companies listed on Euronext Brussels